The Yemeni records in swimming are the fastest ever performances of swimmers from Yemen, which are recognized and ratified by the Yemen Swimming & Aquatics Federation.

All records were set in finals unless noted otherwise.

Long Course (50 m)

Men

Women

Short Course (25 m)

Men

Women

References

Yemen
Records
Swimming
Swimming